Pha Ta Lone Gaung Kyar is a 1954 Burmese black-and-white drama film, directed by Ba Shin starring Khin Maung, Zeya, Mary Myint and May San.

Cast
Khin Maung as Thatoe Shein
Zeya as Min Balu
Mary Myint as Yu Pa Wadi
May San as Mya Wutyi
Maung Chit as Thatoe Saw
Thar Gaung as Kaytumadi Minthar

References

1954 films
1950s Burmese-language films
Films shot in Myanmar
Burmese black-and-white films
1954 drama films
Burmese drama films